Perry Township is one of the fourteen townships of Carroll County, Ohio, United States. As of the 2020 census, the population was 934.

Geography
Located in the southern part of the county, it borders the following townships:
Union Township - north
Lee Township - northeast
Loudon Township - east
Rumley Township, Harrison County - southeast
North Township, Harrison County - south
Monroe Township, Harrison County - southwest
Orange Township - west
Monroe Township - northwest corner

No municipalities are located in Perry Township.

The offices and maintenance garage are located in the unincorporated community of Perrysville, which was platted in 1835. A post office was established in 1848, and continued until 1954. To distinguish this place from Perrysville in Ashland County, the postal service called the place Lamartine.

Name and history
It is one of twenty-six Perry Townships statewide.

The township was originally called "North", but was renamed shortly after the formation of Carroll County.

Government

The township is governed by a three-member board of trustees, who are elected in November of odd-numbered years to a four-year term beginning on the following January 1. Two are elected in the year after the presidential election and one is elected in the year before it. There is also an elected township fiscal officer, who serves a four-year term beginning on April 1 of the year after the election, which is held in November of the year before the presidential election. Vacancies in the fiscal officership or on the board of trustees are filled by the remaining trustees.

Education
Students attend the Carrollton Exempted Village School District in most of the township.

References

External links
County website

Townships in Carroll County, Ohio
Townships in Ohio